OK Liga Femenina is a Spanish rink hockey league for women. It has been held since 2008 and is the women's version of the men's OK Liga.

History
The OK Liga Femenina was created in 2008. In its first edition, it was played without Catalan teams due to the high costs of the travels during the competition.

Competition format
The championship is played through 26 matchdays in al round-robin format, a format quite common in other sports such as football. The top team when finished to play the 26 matchdays is the champion.

Conversely, the last team qualified is relegated to Primera División.
like 
Points are awarded as follows:
3 points for the winner team
1 point if a draw for each team
0 points for loser team

Champions by year

Campeonato de España
The Spanish Championship was played as a knock-out stage in one only city between the best teams at the interregional groups. It worked until 2008, when the current OK Liga was created.

OK Liga

Titles by team

OK Liga

Overall

See also
Copa de la Reina

Notes

References

External links
OK Liga web site
OK Liga Champions at HoqueiPatins.cat
Solo Hockey World Roller Hockey

 
Recurring sporting events established in 1993
1993 establishments in Spain
Women's roller hockey
Spain women